Turkish Wagon Industry, Inc., more commonly known as TÜVASAŞ, is a railcar manufacturer based in Adapazarı. TÜVASAŞ is responsible for the construction, refurbishment and repair of railcars for the Turkish State Railways, and is a 100% shareholder of the Turkish State Railways, reporting directly to the Turkish Ministry of Transport.

The company was founded in 1951 as Vagon Tamir Atölyesi (Wagon Repair Shop) in order to repair existing railcars of TCDD's fleet. Today, TÜVASAŞ has become the largest railcar manufacturer in the Middle East. The headquarters are in the Adapazarı Plant in Mithatpaşa, a neighborhood of Adapazarı. 

TÜVASAŞ and two other rail companies (TÜLOMSAŞ and TÜDEMSAŞ) are in the process of merging under the umbrella of one company, TÜRASAŞ.

Products
The TVS2000 railcars were built by TÜVASAŞ and are their flagship railcar product. The first domestically produced electric trains are due to be in operation by the end of 2020.

See also
 EUROTEM

References

External links
 Official website

Rail vehicle manufacturers of Turkey
Manufacturing companies established in 1951
Rail infrastructure manufacturers
Turkish brands
Turkish companies established in 1951
Sakarya Province
Turkish State Railways
Adapazarı